Tijani Babatunde Folawiyo (also known as Tunde Folawiyo) is a Nigerian businessman. He is the managing director of Yinka Folawiyo Group.  According to Forbes, he has an estimated net worth of $650 million.

Career 
Tunde Folawiyo is Chairman of the Yinka Folawiyo Group, an organisation with interests in energy, agriculture, shipping, and real estate. A conglomerate that was founded by his father, Wahab Folawiyo, Tunde took over the organisation in 2008 when his father passed. He also serves as Director of MTN Nigeria Ltd, Executive Director of Yinka Folawiyo Group of Companies. Tunde also founded Folawiyo Energy Ltd, a subsidiary of the Yinka Folawiyo Group of Companies.

Tunde was previously a non-executive director of Access Bank plc (formerly Access Bank Nigeria) from 11 October 2005 to 29 January 2014. He was called to the Bar of England and Wales in 1985, where he started his law practice in Nigeria with the firm Ogunsanya, but resigned from law in 1989. Since 1996, Tunde has also served as the Vice President of Nigeria Association of Indigenous Petroleum Explorers & Productions (NAIPEC). He is currently the Chairman of Enyo Retail, A Nigerian downstream Oil and Gas Company, and Chairman of Coronation Merchant Bank; an investment banking firm in Nigeria.

Education 
Tunde Folawiyo was educated at the London School of Economics, where he obtained a B.Sc degree in Economics in 1980, and an LL.B in 1984. He obtained an LL.M degree from the University College London in June 1985.

Honours 
In 2010, Tunde was the recipient of the African Leadership Award. He was also awarded an honorary doctorate in business administration from Crescent University in Abeokuta, Nigeria. Tunde serves as a Goodwill Ambassador, Honorary Citizen of the city of Houston and Honorary Consul of Barbados.

Boards and committees 
Tunde is a member of the global advisory board of the African Leadership Academy, a pan-African institute dedicated to developing and mentoring new generations of African leaders. Tunde is a fellow of the Duke of Edinburgh's World Fellowship. He is also a member of the Governing Council of the Lagos State University and the Lagos State Government. He also sits on the Board of Trustees of Crescent University in Abeokuta.

References

Living people
Yoruba businesspeople
Alumni of University College London
Alumni of the London School of Economics
Businesspeople from Lagos
20th-century Nigerian businesspeople
21st-century Nigerian businesspeople
Lagos State University people
Tunde
Nigerian chairpersons of corporations
1960 births